Chipinge, originally known as Chipinga, is a town in Zimbabwe, located in Chipinge District, in Manicaland Province, in southeastern Zimbabwe, close to the border with Mozambique.

Location
The coordinates of the town are: 20° 12' 0.00"S, 32° 37' 12.00"E (Latitude:20.2000; Longitude:32.6200).

Overview

The warm climate and high rainfall are well suited to agriculture. The local farmers grow tea, coffee, macadamia nuts and rear dairy cattle. The surrounding mountain slopes are covered with pine and acacia plantations.

The town is the headquarters of Chipinge District and contain the main offices of Chipinge District Administration and the offices of Chipinge Town Council. Royal Bank Zimbabwe, a commercial bank, maintains a branch in the town. Chipinge is also served by Chipinge Airport, Telone Exchange telecommunications.

Chipinge is divided into five constituencies for election purposes: Chipinge Central, Chipinge North, Chipinge South, Chipinge East
and Musikavanhu.

History
The town was formerly known as Chipinga. A white settlement began here with the arrival of Thomas Moodie's trek in 1893 and was called South Melsetter. Melsetter was the name of his family home in Scotland). In 1903 a police outpost was built here and in 1909 a school was built. The settlement was renamed Chipinga after a local chief in 1907 and in 1946 Chipinga received town status. Dairy farming was established early in the 1900s and by 1931 there were two cheese factories in operation. In 1945 a third cheese factory was open in the town but the same year saw the three factories being amalgamated to form one large factory. Cheese production at this facility continued until 1976. In 1983 Dairibord Zimbabwe under Dairibord Holdings opened a dairy factory making sterilized milk "steri" at 323 Ferreira Street. The area around Chipinge was the first place to grow tea in Zimbabwe, when Grafton and Florence Phillips smuggled seeds from Assam in British India in 1924, while coffee was introduced on a small scale but was not successful until 1950 when a coffee experimental station was established.

Population
According to the 1992 Population Census, the town has a population of 11,582. In 2004, the town's population was estimated at 18,860. The results of the 2012 census indicate 25,675 residents in Chipinge Town.

Climate

Notable people
 Ndabaningi Sithole, ZANU – Ndonga political leader 
 Guy Whittall, Zimbabwean cricketer
 Arthur Mutambara, politician
 Lovemore Madhuku, politician

See also
 Districts of Zimbabwe
 Provinces of Zimbabwe
 Tongogara Refugee Camp, a refugee camp near Chipinge

References

 
Populated places in Manicaland Province
Populated places established in 1893